Strumaria chaplinii is a species of bulbous flowering plant in the family Amaryllidaceae, native to south-west Cape Provinces. It was first described in 1944 as Hessea chaplinii.

Description
Strumaria chaplinii is a very small plant. The upper leaf surfaces are hairy. The flowers are star-shaped, with tepals that have flat faces, unlike similar species such as Strumaria discifera. Like other species of Strumaria, the flowers are borne in an umbel on long pedicels.

Taxonomy
The species was first described as Hessea chaplinii in 1944 by Winsome Fanny Barker. It was transferred to Strumaria in 1994.

Distribution and habitat
Strumaria chaplinii is native to the south-west Cape Provinces of South Africa. It grows in moist pockets at the base of granite rocks in coastal fynbos.

References

chaplinii
Flora of the Cape Provinces
Plants described in 1944